von Ziegesar is a German noble family. Notable people with the surname include:

Sylvie von Ziegesar (1785–1858), German intellectual
Peter von Ziegesar (born 1952), American writer
Cecily von Ziegesar (born 1970), American writer